Longing with Love is a 2020 Burmese drama film, directed by Nay Than Maung starring Daung, Paing Phyo Thu and Angel Lamung. It was based on the popular novel Longing with Love written by Nu Nu Yi (Inwa). It was released as a series with 12 episodes from February 14 to May 2, 2019. The film was premiered in Myanmar Cinemas on February 13, 2020.

Synopsis
The story focuses on the love triangle between three young students;  Moe Mu Yar Naing, Naung Min Latt and Shin Hnin Nyo who studied and lived together on campus.

Cast
Daung as Naung Min Latt
Paing Phyo Thu as Moe Mu Yar Naing
Angel Lamung as Shin Hnin Nyo
Man Hein Khant as Htain Lin
Arkar Soe as Thura Maung
Soe Wai Naing as Kay Sett Naing
Aung Lwin
Min Oo
Myo Thandar Tun
Chit Snow Su
Wai Moe San

References

2020 films
2020s Burmese-language films
Burmese drama films
Films shot in Myanmar
2020 drama films